Gavin Christopher Newsom (born October 10, 1967) is an American politician and businessman who has been the 40th governor of California since 2019. A member of the Democratic Party, he served as the 49th lieutenant governor of California from 2011 to 2019 and the 42nd mayor of San Francisco from 2004 to 2011.

Newsom attended Redwood High School and graduated from Santa Clara University. After graduation, he founded the PlumpJack wine store with billionaire heir and family friend, Gordon Getty, as an investor. The PlumpJack Group grew to manage 23 businesses, including wineries, restaurants and hotels. Newsom began his political career in 1996, when San Francisco mayor Willie Brown appointed him to the city's Parking and Traffic Commission. Brown appointed Newsom to fill a vacancy on the Board of Supervisors the next year and Newsom was elected to the board in 1998, 2000 and 2002.

In 2003, at age 36, Newsom was elected the 42nd mayor of San Francisco, the city's youngest in a century. He was reelected in 2007 with 72% of the vote.

Newsom was elected lieutenant governor of California in 2010, defeating incumbent Republican Abel Maldonado, and reelected in 2014. He was elected governor in the 2018 election. He faced criticism for his personal behavior and leadership during the COVID-19 pandemic, which was followed by an attempt to recall him from office. He prevailed in the 2021 recall election, "emphatically beating" what he labeled the Republican effort to remove him. Newsom was elected to a second term in the 2022 election.

Newsom hosted The Gavin Newsom Show on Current TV from 2012 to 2013 and wrote the 2013 book Citizenville, about using digital tools for democratic change. Political science analysis has suggested he is moderate relative to almost all Democratic legislators in California.

Early life 
Newsom was born in San Francisco, California, to Tessa Thomas (née Menzies) and William Alfred Newsom III, a state appeals court judge and attorney for Getty Oil. He is a fourth-generation San Franciscan. One of Newsom's maternal great-grandfathers, Scotsman Thomas Addis, was a pioneer scientist in the field of nephrology and a professor of medicine at Stanford University. Newsom is the second cousin, twice removed, of musician Joanna Newsom. Newsom's aunt was married to Ron Pelosi, the brother-in-law of then Speaker of the United States House of Representatives Nancy Pelosi.

His father was an advocate for otters and the family had one as a pet. Newsom's parents divorced in 1972 when he was a boy.

Newsom has said he did not have an easy childhood, partly due to dyslexia. He attended kindergarten and first grade at Ecole Notre Dame Des Victoires, a French-American bilingual school in San Francisco, but eventually transferred out, due to the severe dyslexia that still affects him. It has challenged his abilities to write, spell, read, and work with numbers. Throughout his schooling, Newsom had to rely on a combination of audiobooks, digests, and informal verbal instruction. To this day, he prefers to interpret documents and reports through audio.

Newsom attended third through fifth grades at Notre Dame des Victoires, where he was placed in remedial reading classes. In high school, he played basketball and baseball and graduated from Redwood High School in 1985. Newsom was a shooting guard in basketball and an outfielder in baseball. His skills placed him on the cover of the Marin Independent Journal.

Tessa Newsom worked three jobs to support Gavin and his sister Hilary Newsom Callan. In an interview with The San Francisco Chronicle, his sister recalled Christmases when their mother told them they would not receive any gifts. Tessa opened their home to foster children, instilling in Newsom the importance of public service. His father's finances were strapped in part because of his tendency to give away his earnings. Newsom worked several jobs in high school to help support his family.

Newsom attended Santa Clara University on a partial baseball scholarship, graduating in 1989 with a Bachelor of Science with a major in political science. He was a left-handed pitcher for Santa Clara, but he threw his arm out after two years and has not thrown a baseball since. He lived in the Alameda Apartments, which he later compared to living in a hotel. He has reflected on his education fondly, crediting Santa Clara's Jesuit approach with helping him become an independent thinker who questions orthodoxy. While in school, Newsom spent a semester studying abroad in Rome, Italy.

Business career 
Newsom and his investors created the company PlumpJack Associates L.P. on May 14, 1991. The group started the PlumpJack Winery in 1992 with the financial help of his family friend Gordon Getty. PlumpJack was the name of an opera written by Getty, who invested in 10 of Newsom's 11 businesses. Getty told the San Francisco Chronicle that he treated Newsom like a son and invested in his first business venture because of that relationship. According to Getty, later business investments were because of "the success of the first".

One of Newsom's early interactions with government occurred when Newsom resisted the San Francisco Health Department requirement to install a sink at his PlumpJack wine store. The Health Department argued that wine was a food and required the store to install a $27,000 sink in the carpeted wine shop on the grounds that the shop needed the sink for a mop. When Newsom was later appointed supervisor, he told the San Francisco Examiner: "That's the kind of bureaucratic malaise I'm going to be working through."

The business grew to an enterprise with more than 700 employees. The PlumpJack Cafe Partners L.P. opened the PlumpJack Café, also on Fillmore Street, in 1993. Between 1993 and 2000, Newsom and his investors opened several other businesses that included the PlumpJack Squaw Valley Inn with a PlumpJack Café (1994), a winery in Napa Valley (1995), the Balboa Café Bar and Grill (1995), the PlumpJack Development Fund L.P. (1996), the MatrixFillmore Bar (1998), PlumpJack Wines shop Noe Valley branch (1999), PlumpJackSport retail clothing (2000), and a second Balboa Café at Squaw Valley (2000). Newsom's investments included five restaurants and two retail clothing stores. Newsom's annual income was greater than $429,000 from 1996 to 2001. In 2002, his business holdings were valued at more than $6.9 million. Newsom gave a monthly $50 gift certificate to PlumpJack employees whose business ideas failed, because in his view, "There can be no success without failure."

Newsom sold his share of his San Francisco businesses when he became mayor in 2004. He maintained his ownership in the PlumpJack companies outside San Francisco, including the PlumpJack Winery in Oakville, California, new PlumpJack-owned Cade Winery in Angwin, California, and the PlumpJack Squaw Valley Inn. He is the president in absentia of Airelle Wines Inc., which is connected to the PlumpJack Winery in Napa County. Newsom earned between $141,000 and $251,000 in 2007 from his business interests. In February 2006, he paid $2,350,000 for his residence in the Russian Hill neighborhood, which he put on the market in April 2009 for $3,000,000.

At the time of the Silicon Valley Bank collapse in March 2023, it was acknowledged that at least three of Newsom's wine companies, PlumpJack, Cade and Odette, were Silicon Valley Bank clients.

Early political career 

Newsom's first political experience came when he volunteered for Willie Brown's successful campaign for mayor in 1995. Newsom hosted a private fundraiser at his PlumpJack Café. Brown appointed Newsom to a vacant seat on the Parking and Traffic Commission in 1996, and he was later elected president of the commission. Brown appointed him to the San Francisco Board of Supervisors seat vacated by Kevin Shelley in 1997. At the time, he was the youngest member of San Francisco's board of supervisors.

Newsom was sworn in by his father and pledged to bring his business experience to the board. Brown called Newsom "part of the future generation of leaders of this great city". Newsom described himself as a "social liberal and a fiscal watchdog". He was elected to a full four-year term to the board in 1998. San Francisco voters chose to abandon at-large elections to the board for the previous district system in 1999. Newsom was reelected in 2000 and 2002 to represent the second district, which includes Pacific Heights, the Marina, Cow Hollow, Sea Cliff and Laurel Heights, which had San Francisco's highest income level and highest Republican registration. Newsom paid $500 to the San Francisco Republican Party to appear on the party's endorsement slate in 2000 while running for Supervisor. He faced no opposition in his 2002 reelection bid.

As a San Francisco Supervisor, Newsom gained public attention for his role in advocating reform of the city's municipal railway (Muni). He was one of two supervisors endorsed by Rescue Muni, a transit riders group, in his 1998 reelection. He sponsored Proposition B to require Muni and other city departments to develop detailed customer service plans. The measure passed with 56.6% of the vote. Newsom sponsored a ballot measure from Rescue Muni; a version of the measure was approved by voters in November 1999.

Newsom also supported allowing restaurants to serve alcohol at their outdoor tables, banning tobacco advertisements visible from the streets, stiffer penalties for landlords who run afoul of rent-control laws, and a resolution, which was defeated, to commend Colin Powell for raising money for youth programs. Newsom's support for business interests at times strained his relationship with labor leaders.

During Newsom's time as supervisor, he supported housing projects through public-private partnerships to increase homeownership and affordable housing in San Francisco. He supported HOPE, a failed local ballot measure that would have allowed an increased condo-conversion rate if a certain percentage of tenants within a building were buying their units. As a candidate for mayor, he supported building 10,000 new housing units to create 15,000 new construction jobs.

Newsom's signature achievement as a supervisor was a voter initiative called Care Not Cash (Measure N), which offered care, supportive housing, drug treatment, and help from behavioral health specialists for the homeless in lieu of direct cash aid from the state's general assistance program. Many homeless rights advocates protested against the initiative. "Progressives and Democrats, nuns and priests, homeless advocates and homeless people were furious", Newsom said. The successfully passed ballot measure raised his political profile and provided the volunteers, donors, and campaign staff that helped make him a leading contender for the mayorship in 2003. In a city audit conducted four years after the inception of program and released in 2008, the program was evaluated as largely successful.

Mayor of San Francisco (2004–2011)

Elections

2003 

Newsom placed first in the November 4, 2003, general election in a nine-person field. He received 41.9% of the vote to Green Party candidate Matt Gonzalez's 19.6% in the first round of balloting, but he faced a closer race in the December 9 runoff, when many of the city's progressive groups supported Gonzalez. The race was partisan, with attacks against Gonzalez for his support of Ralph Nader in the 2000 presidential election, and attacks against Newsom for contributing $500 to a Republican slate mailer in 2000 that endorsed issues Newsom supported. Democratic leadership felt they needed to reinforce San Francisco as a Democratic stronghold after losing the 2000 presidential election and the 2003 gubernatorial recall election to Arnold Schwarzenegger. National Democratic Party figures, including Bill Clinton, Al Gore, and Jesse Jackson, campaigned for Newsom. Five supervisors endorsed Gonzalez, while Willie Brown endorsed Newsom.

Newsom won the runoff with 53% of the vote to Gonzalez's 47%, a margin of 11,000 votes. He ran as a business-friendly centrist Democrat and a moderate in San Francisco politics; some of his opponents called him conservative. Newsom claimed he was a centrist in the Dianne Feinstein mold. He ran on the slogan "great cities, great ideas", and presented over 21 policy papers. He pledged to continue working on San Francisco's homelessness issue.

Newsom was sworn in as mayor on January 3, 2004. He called for unity among the city's political factions, and promised to address the issues of public schools, potholes and affordable housing. Newsom said he was "a different kind of leader" who "isn't afraid to solve even the toughest problems".

2007

San Francisco's progressive community tried to field a candidate to run a strong campaign against Newsom. Supervisors Ross Mirkarimi and Chris Daly considered running, but both declined. Gonzalez also decided not to challenge Newsom again.

When the August 10, 2007, filing deadline passed, San Francisco's discussion shifted to talk about Newsom's second term. He was challenged in the election by 13 candidates, including George Davis, a nudist activist, and Michael Powers, owner of the Power Exchange sex club. Conservative former supervisor Tony Hall withdrew by early September due to lack of support.

The San Francisco Chronicle declared in August 2007 that Newsom faced no "serious threat to his re-election bid", having raised $1.6 million for his reelection campaign by early August. He was reelected on November 6 with over 72% of the vote. Upon taking office for a second term, Newsom promised to focus on the environment, homelessness, health care, education, housing, and rebuilding San Francisco General Hospital.

Mayoralty

As mayor, Newsom focused on development projects in Hunters Point and Treasure Island.

He gained national attention in 2004 when he directed the San Francisco city–county clerk to issue marriage licenses to same-sex couples, violating the state law passed in 2000. Implementation of Care Not Cash, the initiative he had sponsored as a supervisor, began on July 1, 2004. As part of the initiative, 5,000 more homeless people were given permanent shelter in the city. About 2,000 people had been placed into permanent housing with support by 2007. Other programs Newsom initiated to end chronic homelessness included the San Francisco Homeless Outreach Team (SF HOT) and Project Homeless Connect (PHC), which placed 2,000 homeless people into permanent housing and provided 5,000 additional affordable rental units in the city.

During a strike by hotel workers against a dozen San Francisco hotels, Newsom joined UNITE HERE union members on a picket line in front of the Westin St. Francis Hotel on October 27, 2004. He vowed that the city would boycott the hotels by not sponsoring city events at them until they agreed to a contract with workers. The contract dispute was settled in September 2006.

In 2005, Newsom pushed for a state law to allow California communities to create policy restricting certain breeds of dogs. In 2007, he signed the law establishing Healthy San Francisco to provide city residents with universal health care, the first city in the nation to do so.

Newsom came under attack from the San Francisco Democratic Party in 2009 for his failure to implement the City of San Francisco's sanctuary city rule, under which the city was to not assist U.S. Immigration and Customs Enforcement.

The same year, Newsom received the Leadership for Healthy Communities Award, along with Mayor Michael Bloomberg of New York City and three other public officials, for his commitment to making healthful food and physical activity options more accessible to children and families. He hosted the Urban-Rural Roundtable in 2008 to explore ways to promote regional food development and increased access to healthy, affordable food. Newsom secured $8 million in federal and local funds for the Better Streets program, which ensures that public health perspectives are fully integrated into urban planning processes. He signed a menu-labeling bill into law, requiring that chain restaurants print nutrition information on their menus.

Newsom was named "America's Most Social Mayor" in 2010 by Same Point, based on analysis of the social media profiles of mayors of the 100 largest U.S. cities.

Same-sex marriage
Newsom gained national attention in 2004 when he directed the San Francisco city–county clerk to issue marriage licenses to same-sex couples, violating state law. In August 2004, the Supreme Court of California annulled the marriages Newsom had authorized, as they conflicted with state law. Still, Newsom's unexpected move brought national attention to the issue of same-sex marriage, solidifying political support for him in San Francisco and in the LGBTQ+ community.

During the 2008 election, Newsom opposed Proposition 8, the ballot initiative to reverse the Supreme Court of California ruling that there was a constitutional right to same-sex marriage. Proposition 8 supporters released a commercial featuring footage of Newsom saying the following in a speech regarding same-sex marriage: "This door's wide open now. It's going to happen, whether you like it or not." Some observers noted that polls shifted in favor of Proposition 8 after the commercial's release; this, in turn, led to speculation that Newsom had inadvertently played a role in the amendment's passage.

Lieutenant governor of California (2011–2019)

Elections

2010

In April 2009, Newsom announced his candidacy for governor of California in the 2010 election. He received the endorsement of former President Bill Clinton in September 2009. During the campaign, Newsom remarked that, if elected, he would like to be known as "The Gavinator" (a reference to the nickname of incumbent Governor Arnold Schwarzenegger, "The Governator"). Throughout the campaign, he had low poll numbers, trailing Democratic frontrunner Jerry Brown by more than 20 points in most polls. Newsom dropped out of the race in October 2009.

Newsom filed initial paperwork to run for lieutenant governor in February 2010, and officially announced his candidacy in March. He received the Democratic nomination in June and won the election on November 2, 2010. Newsom was sworn in as lieutenant governor on January 10, 2011, and served under Governor Jerry Brown. The one-week delay was to ensure that a successor as mayor of San Francisco was chosen before he left office. Edwin M. Lee, the city administrator, took office the day after Newsom was sworn in as lieutenant governor.

While lieutenant governor, in May 2012, Newsom began hosting The Gavin Newsom Show on Current TV. The same month, he drew criticism for calling Sacramento "dull" and saying he was only there once a week, adding, "there's no reason" to be there otherwise.

2014

Newsom was reelected as lieutenant governor on November 4, 2014, defeating Republican Ron Nehring with 57.2% of the vote. His second term began on January 5, 2015.

Capital punishment
Newsom supported a failed measure in 2012 that sought to end capital punishment in California. He claimed the initiative would save California millions of dollars, citing statistics that California had spent $5 billion since 1978 to execute just 13 people.

In 2016, Newsom supported Proposition 62, which also would have repealed the death penalty in California. He argued that Prop. 62 would get rid of a system "that is administered with troubling racial disparities" and said that the death penalty was fundamentally immoral and did not deter crime. Proposition 62 failed.

Criminal justice and cannabis legalization
In 2014, Newsom was the only statewide politician to endorse California Proposition 47, legislation that recategorized certain nonviolent offenses like drug and property crimes as misdemeanors as opposed to felonies. Voters passed the measure on November 4, 2014.

In July 2015, Newsom released the Blue Ribbon Commission on Marijuana Policy's final report, which he had convened with the American Civil Liberties Union of California in 2013. The report's recommendations to regulate marijuana were intended to inform a legalization measure on the November 2016 ballot. Newsom supported the resulting measure, Proposition 64, which legalized cannabis use and cultivation for California state residents who are 21 or older.

On February 24, 2017, in response to pro-enforcement statements by White House Press Secretary Sean Spicer, Newsom sent Attorney General Jeff Sessions and President Donald Trump a letter urging them not to increase federal enforcement against recreational cannabis firms opening in California. He wrote: "The government must not strip the legal and publicly supported industry of its business and hand it back to drug cartels and criminals ... Dealers don't card kids. I urge you and your administration to work in partnership with California and the other eight states that have legalized recreational marijuana for adult use in a way that will let us enforce our state laws that protect the public and our children while targeting the bad actors." Newsom responded to comments by Spicer that compared cannabis to opioids: "Unlike marijuana, opioids represent an addictive and harmful substance, and I would welcome your administration's focused efforts on tackling this particular public health crisis."

Education 
Newsom joined Long Beach City College Superintendent Eloy Oakley in a November 2015 op-ed calling for the creation of the California College Promise, which would create partnerships between public schools, public universities, and employers and offer a free community college education. Throughout 2016, he joined Oakland mayor Libby Schaaf at the launch of the Oakland Promise and Second Lady Jill Biden and Los Angeles mayor Eric Garcetti at the launch of the LA Promise. In June 2016, Newsom helped secure $15 million in the state budget to support the creation of promise programs throughout the state.

In December 2015, Newsom called on the University of California to reclassify computer science courses as a core academic class to incentivize more high schools to offer computer science curriculum. He sponsored successful legislation signed by Governor Brown in September 2016, that began the planning process for expanding computer science education to all state students, beginning as early as kindergarten.

In 2016, Newsom passed a series of reforms at the University of California to give student-athletes additional academic and injury-related support, and to ensure that contracts for athletic directors and coaches emphasized academic progress. This came in response to several athletics programs, including the University of California – Berkeley's football team, which had the lowest graduation rates in the country.

Technology in government 
Newsom released his first book, Citizenville: How to Take the Town Square Digital and Reinvent Government, on February 7, 2013. The book discusses the Gov 2.0 movement taking place across the nation. After its release, Newsom began to work with the Center for Information Technology Research in the Interest of Society at the University of California, Berkeley, on the California Report Card (CRC). The CRC is a mobile-optimized platform that allows state residents to "grade" their state on six timely issues. The CRC exemplifies ideas presented in Citizenville, encouraging direct public involvement in government affairs via technology.

In 2015, Newsom partnered with the Institute for Advanced Technology and Public Policy at California Polytechnic State University to launch Digital Democracy, an online tool that uses facial and voice recognition to enable users to navigate California legislative proceedings.

Governor of California (2019–present)

Elections

2018

On February 11, 2015, Newsom announced that he was opening a campaign account for governor in the 2018 elections, allowing him to raise funds for a campaign to succeed Brown as governor of California. On June 5, 2018, he finished in the top two in the nonpartisan blanket primary, and he defeated Republican John H. Cox by a landslide in the November 6 general election.

Newsom was sworn in on January 7, 2019.

2021 recall 

Several recall attempts were launched against Newsom early in his tenure, but they failed to gain much traction. On February 21, 2020, a recall petition was introduced by Orrin Heatlie, a deputy sheriff in Yolo County. The petition mentioned Newsom's sanctuary state policy and said laws he endorsed favored "foreign nationals, in our country illegally"; said that California had high homelessness, high taxes, and low quality of life; and described other grievances. The California secretary of state approved it for circulation on June 10, 2020.

Forcing the gubernatorial recall election required a total of 1,495,709 verified signatures. By August 2020, 55,000 signatures were submitted and verified by the secretary of state, and 890 new valid signatures were submitted by October 2020. The petition was initially given a signature deadline of November 17, 2020, but it was extended to March 17, 2021, after Judge James P. Arguelles ruled that petitioners could have more time because of the pandemic. Newsom's attendance at a party at The French Laundry in November 2020, despite his public health measures; voter anger over lockdowns, job losses, school and business closures; and a $31 billion fraud scandal at the state unemployment agency were credited for the recall's growing support. The French Laundry event took place on November 6, and between November 5 and December 7 over 442,000 new signatures were submitted and verified; 1,664,010 verified signatures, representing roughly 98% of the final verified total of 1,719,900, were submitted between November 2020 and March 17, 2021.

On September 14, 2021, the recall election was held, with only 38% voting to recall Newsom, failing to remove him from office.

2022 

In 2022, Newsom was elected to a second term, defeating Republican state senator Brian Dahle.

Appointments
After U.S. Senator Kamala Harris was elected vice president of the United States in the 2020 presidential election, Newsom appointed Secretary of State of California Alex Padilla to succeed her as California's junior U.S. senator. To replace Padilla as secretary of state, Newsom appointed Assemblywoman Shirley Weber. After the U.S. Senate confirmed Xavier Becerra as U.S. Secretary of Health and Human Services, Newsom appointed Rob Bonta Attorney General of California. In an interview with Joy Reid, Newsom was asked whether he would appoint a Black woman to replace Dianne Feinstein if she were to retire from the Senate or die before her term ended in 2024; Newsom replied that he would.

Criminal justice

Capital punishment

On March 13, 2019, three years after voters narrowly rejected its repeal, Newsom declared a moratorium on the state's death penalty, preventing any execution in the state as long as he remained governor. The move also led to the withdrawal of the state's current lethal injection protocol and the execution chamber's closure at San Quentin State Prison. In a CBS This Morning interview, Newsom said that the death penalty is "a racist system ... that is perpetuating inequality. It's a system that I cannot in good conscience support." The moratorium granted a temporary reprieve for all 737 inmates on California's death row, then the largest death row in the Western Hemisphere.

In January 2022, Newsom directed the state to begin dismantling its death row in San Quentin, to be transformed into a "space for rehabilitation programs", as all the condemned inmates are moving to other prisons that have maximum security facilities. The state's voters upheld capital punishment in 2012 and 2016, with the latter measure agreeing to move the condemned to other prisons. Though a 2021 poll by the UC Berkeley Institute of Governmental Studies and co-sponsored by the Los Angeles Times suggested declining support for the death penalty among California's voters, Republican opponents criticized Newsom's moves to halt capital punishment in California as defiance of the will of voters, and capital punishment advocates said they denied closure to murder victims' families.

Clemency
In response to the Trump administration's crackdown on immigrants with criminal records, Newsom gave heightened consideration to people in this situation. A pardon can eliminate the grounds for deportation of immigrants who would otherwise be legal permanent residents. Pardon requests from people facing deportation are given expedited review by the state Board of Parole Hearings, per a 2018 California law. In his first acts of clemency as governor, Newsom pardoned seven formerly incarcerated people in May 2019, including two Cambodian refugees facing deportation. He pardoned three men who were attempting to avoid being deported to Cambodia or Vietnam in November 2019. They had separately committed crimes when they were each 19 years old. In December 2019, Newsom granted parole to a Cambodian refugee who had been held in a California prison due to a murder case. Although immigrant rights groups wanted Newsom to end policies allowing the transfer to federal agents, the refugee was turned over for possible deportation upon release.

Newsom denied parole to Sirhan Sirhan on January 13, 2022, the 1968 assassin of Robert F. Kennedy who had been recommended for parole by a parole board after serving 53 years in prison. Newsom wrote an op-ed for the Los Angeles Times saying Sirhan "still lacks the insight that would prevent him from making the kind of dangerous and destructive decisions he made in the past. The most glaring proof of Sirhan's deficient insight is his shifting narrative about his assassination of Kennedy, and his current refusal to accept responsibility for it."

Police reform
Newsom has spoken in favor of Assembly Bill 1196, which would ban carotid artery restraints and choke holds in California. He has claimed that there is no longer a place for a policing tactic "that literally is designed to stop people's blood from flowing into their brain, that has no place any longer in 21st-century practices."

In September 2021, Newsom signed legislation raising the minimum age to become a police officer from 18 to 21. Also in the bills were restrictions on the use of tear gas and a ban on police departments employing officers after misconduct or crimes. Among the bills was the George Floyd Bill, requiring officers to intervene when witnessing excessive force on the part of another officer.

Transgender prisoners
In September 2020, Newsom signed into law a bill allowing California transgender inmates to be placed in prisons that correspond with their gender identity.

Disasters and emergencies

COVID-19 pandemic

Newsom declared a state of emergency on March 4, 2020, after the first death in California attributable to the novel SARS-CoV-2 coronavirus disease (COVID-19). His stated intention was to help California prepare for and contain COVID-19's spread. The emergency declaration allowed state agencies to more easily procure equipment and services, share information on patients and alleviated restrictions on the use of state-owned properties and facilities. Newsom also announced that mitigation policies for the state's estimated 108,000 unsheltered homeless people would be prioritized, with a significant push to move them indoors.

Newsom issued an executive order that allowed the state to commandeer hotels and medical facilities to treat COVID-19 patients and permitted government officials to hold teleconferences in private without violating open meeting laws. He also directed local school districts to make their own decisions on school closures, but used an executive order to ensure students' needs would be met whether or not their school was physically open. The U.S. Department of Agriculture approved the Newsom administration's request to offer meal service during school closures, which included families being able to pick up those meals at libraries, parks, or other off-campus locations. Roughly 80% of students at California's public schools receive free or reduced-price meals. This executive order included continued funding for remote learning opportunities and child care options during workday hours.

As the number of confirmed COVID-19 cases in the state continued to rise, on March 15, Newsom urged people 65 and older and those with chronic health conditions to isolate themselves from others. He also called on bars and brewery and winery tasting rooms to close their doors to patrons. Some local jurisdictions had mandatory closures. The closures were extended to movie theaters and health clubs. He asked restaurants to stop serving meals inside their establishments and offer take-out meals only. His statewide order to stay at home became mandatory on March 19. It allowed movement outside the home for necessities or recreation, but people were required to maintain a safe distance apart. Activity "needed to maintain continuity of operation of the federal critical infrastructure sectors, critical government services, schools, childcare, and construction" was excluded from the order. Essential services such as grocery stores and pharmacies remained open. Newsom provided state funds to pay for protective measures such as hotel room lodging for hospital and other essential workers fearing returning home and infecting family members. By April 26, he had issued 30 executive orders under the state of emergency while the legislature had not been in session.

On April 28, Newsom, along with the governors of Oregon and Washington, announced a "shared approach" for reopening their economies. His administration outlined key indicators for altering his stay-at-home mandate, including the ability to closely monitor and track potential cases, prevent infection of high-risk people, increase surge capacity at hospitals, develop therapeutics, ensure physical distancing at schools, businesses, and child-care facilities, and develop guidelines for restoring isolation orders if the virus surges. The plan to end the shutdown had four phases. Newsom emphasized that easing restrictions would be based on data, not dates, saying, "We will base reopening plans on facts and data, not on ideology. Not what we want. Not what we hope." Of a return of Major League Baseball and the NFL, he said, "I would move very cautiously in that expectation."

In early May, Newsom announced that certain retailers could reopen for pickup. Most Californians approved of Newsom's handling of the crisis and were more concerned about reopening too early than too late, but there were demonstrations and protests against these policies. Under pressure, Newsom delegated more decision-making on reopening to the local level. That same month, he announced a plan for registered voters to have the option to vote by mail in the November election. California was the first state in the country to commit to sending mail-in ballots to all registered voters for the November general election.

As the state opened up, the Los Angeles Times found that new coronavirus hospitalizations in California began accelerating around June 15 at a rate not seen since early April, immediately after the virus began rapidly spreading in the state. On June 18, Newsom made face coverings mandatory for all Californians in an effort to reduce COVID-19's spread. Enforcement would be up to business owners, as local law enforcement agencies view non-compliance as a minor infraction. By the end of June, he had ordered seven counties to close bars and nightspots, and recommended eight other counties take action on their own to close those businesses due to a surge of coronavirus cases in some parts of the state. In a regular press conference on July 13 as he was ordering the reinstatement of the shutdown of bars and indoor dining in restaurants, he said, "We're seeing an increase in the spread of the virus, so that's why it's incumbent upon all of us to recognize soberly that COVID-19 is not going away any time soon until there is a vaccine or an effective therapy".

Newsom oversaw a sluggish initial rollout of vaccines; California had one of the lowest vaccination rates in the country by January 2021, and had only used about 30% of the vaccines it had at its disposal, a far lower rate than other states, by January 20. After reaching high approval ratings, specifically 64% in September 2020, a UC Berkeley Institute of Governmental Studies poll from February 2021 showed that Newsom's approval rate was down to 46%, with 48% disapproval, the highest of his tenure. The Los Angeles Times attributed this decline to public opinion of his management of the pandemic. The vaccination rate began increasing in January, with over half the population fully vaccinated as of September 2021, the percentage ranking #16 out of the 50 states.

Despite Newsom's administration enacting some of the country's toughest pandemic restrictions, California had the 29th-highest death rate out of all 50 states by May 2021. Monica Gandhi, a leading COVID-19 expert from UCSF, said that California's restrictive approach "did not lead to better health outcomes", and criticized California's delay in implementing new CDC recommendations absolving the fully vaccinated from most indoor mask requirements, while saying the decision lacked scientific rationale and could cause "collateral damage".

Pandemic unemployment fraud and debt 

In January 2021, the Los Angeles Times reported that Newsom's administration had mismanaged $11.4 billion by disbursing unemployment benefits to ineligible claimants, especially those paid through the federally funded Pandemic Unemployment Assistance program. Another $19 billion in claims remained under investigation for fraud. At the same time, legitimate claimants faced lengthy delays in receiving benefits. The state's unemployment system had been overseen by California Labor Secretary Julie Su, a Newsom appointee, whom President Joe Biden later appointed as deputy secretary of labor in February 2021.

Political opponents attributed the crisis to the Newsom administration's failure to heed multiple warnings by federal officials of the potential for fraud, while Newsom's administration said the Trump administration's failure to provide appropriate guidance for the new federally funded program contributed to the fraud. Experts said much of the fraud appeared to originate from international criminal gangs in 20 countries. A report by California State Auditor Elaine Howle said $810 million was disbursed to claimants who had fraudulently filed on behalf of inmates in the state's prison system.

According to The Sacramento Bee, by the summer of 2021, California owed $23 billion to the federal government for unemployment benefits paid out during the pandemic, which was 43% of all unemployment debt, owed by 13 states at the time, to the federal government. Most of this debt was unrelated to the federally funded pandemic unemployment programs that had experienced most of the fraud, and instead was due to longstanding underfunding and California's high rate of unemployment during the pandemic.

Wildfires

Due to a mass die-off of trees throughout California that could increase the risk of wildfires, Newsom declared a state of emergency on March 22, 2020, in preparation for the 2020 wildfire season. After declaring a state of emergency on August 18, he reported that the state was battling 367 known fires, many sparked by intense thunderstorms on August 16–17. His request for assistance via issuance of a federal disaster declaration in the wake of six major wildfires was first rejected by the Trump administration, but accepted after Trump spoke to Newsom.

According to CapRadio, the fuel breaks of the 35 "priority projects" Newsom had touted, which were meant to ensure the quick evacuation of residents while preventing traffic jams and a repeat of events in the 2018 fire that destroyed the town of Paradise, where at least eight evacuees burned to death in their vehicles, were struggling to mitigate fire spread in almost every instance while failing to prevent evacuation traffic jams. The same day CapRadio revealed the oversight, leaked emails showed that Newsom's handpicked Cal Fire chief had ordered the removal of the original statement. In another report in April 2022, CapRadio found a program, hailed in 2020 by the Newsom administration to fast-track environmental reviews on high-priority fire prevention projects, had failed to make progress.

KXTV released a series of reports chronicling PG&E's liabilities after committing 91 felonies in the Santa Rosa and Paradise fires. Newsom was accused of accepting campaign donations from PG&E in order to change the CPUC's ruling on PG&E's safety license. The rating change allowed PG&E to avoid billions of dollars in extra fees. Newsom was also accused of setting up the Wildfire Insurance Fund via AB 1054, using ratepayer fees, so PG&E could avoid financial losses and pass the liability costs to ratepayers and taxpayers.

Energy and environment

Upon taking office in 2019, Newsom succeeded Brown as co-chair of the United States Climate Alliance. In September 2019, Newsom vetoed SB 1, which would have preserved environmental protections at the state level that were set to roll back nationally under the Trump administration's environmental policy. In February 2020, the Newsom administration sued federal agencies over the rollbacks to protect imperiled fish in the Sacramento–San Joaquin River Delta in 2019.

Newsom attended the 2019 UN Climate Action Summit, where he spoke of California as a climate leader due to the actions of governors before him. In August 2020, he addressed the 2020 Democratic National Convention. His speech mentioned climate change and the wildfires prevalent in California at the time. On September 23, 2020, Newsom signed an executive order to phase out sales of gasoline-powered vehicles and require all new passenger vehicles sold in the state to be zero-emission by 2035. Bills he signed in September with an environmental focus included a commission to study lithium extraction around the Salton Sea.

During his 2018 campaign, Newsom pledged to tighten state oversight of fracking and oil extraction. Early in his governorship, his administration approved new oil and gas leases on public lands at about twice the rate of the prior year. When asked about this development, Newsom said he was unaware of the rate of approvals, and he later fired the head of the Division of Oil, Gas and Geothermal Resources. In November 2019, he imposed a moratorium on approval of new hydraulic fracturing and steam-injected oil drilling in the state until the permits for those projects could be reviewed by an independent panel of scientists. State agencies resumed issuing new hydraulic fracturing permits in April 2020. In 2021, the Center for Biological Diversity sued the Newsom administration over the continued sale of oil and gas leases, and Consumer Watchdog called for the end of their sale. In April 2021, Newsom committed to ending the sale of gas leases by 2024 and ending oil extraction by 2045. In October 2021, he proposed a  buffer between new fossil fuel extraction sites and densely populated areas.

Ethics concerns

Donations to spouse's nonprofit organization 
The Sacramento Bee reported that Jennifer Siebel Newsom's nonprofit organization The Representation Project had received more than $800,000 in donations from corporations that had lobbied the state government in recent years, including PG&E, AT&T, Comcast, and Kaiser Permanente. Siebel Newsom received $2.3 million in salary from the nonprofit since launching it in 2011. In 2021, Governor Newsom said that he saw no conflict in his wife's nonprofit accepting donations from companies that lobby his administration.

Executive authority and actions 
Overall, Newsom has vetoed legislation at a rate comparable to that of his predecessors. From 2019 to 2021, he vetoed 12.7% of the bills passed by the legislature on average. The rate declined over the course of the three legislative sessions. Newsom's vetoes have included bills to allow ranked-choice voting, require an ethnic studies class as a high school graduation requirement, and reduce penalties for jaywalking.

Newsom used a larger than normal number of executive orders during the 2020 legislative session.

Gun control 

As lieutenant governor in 2016, Newsom was the official proponent of Proposition 63. The ballot measure required a background check and California Department of Justice authorization to purchase ammunition, among other gun control regulations. In response to the 2019 mass shooting in Virginia Beach, Newsom called for nationwide background checks on people purchasing ammunition. Later that year, he responded to the Gilroy Garlic Festival shooting by stating his support for the 2nd Amendment and saying he would like national cooperation controlling "weapons of goddamned mass destruction". He also said, "These shootings overwhelmingly, almost exclusively, are males, boys, 'men'—I put in loose quotes. I do think that is missing in the national conversation."

On June 10, 2021, Newsom called federal Judge Roger Benitez "a stone cold ideologue" and "a wholly owned subsidiary of the gun lobby of the National Rifle Association" after Benitez struck down California's statewide ban on assault weapons. While the ban remained in place as the state appealed the ruling, Newsom proposed legislation that would empower private citizens to enforce the ban after the United States Supreme Court declined to strike down the Texas Heartbeat Act, which empowers private citizens to report unauthorized abortions.

On July 1, 2022, Newsom signed two gun control bills (AB 1621, 2571) passed by the legislature. Assembly Bill 1621 restricts privately manufactured ghost guns, which were found to be linked to over 100 violent crimes in Los Angeles. Assembly Bill 2571 prohibited the marketing of firearms such as the JR-15 to children.

On July 22, 2022, Newsom signed Senate Bill 1327, a law enabling private citizens to sue anyone who imports, distributes, manufactures or sells illegal firearms in California. The law requires courts to award statutory damages of at least $10,000 and attorney's fees.

Health care

Newsom campaigned on reducing the cost of health care and increasing access. He also indicated his support for creating a universal state health-care system. The budget passed in June 2019 expanded eligibility for Medi-Cal from solely undocumented minor children to undocumented young adults from ages 19 to 25. In 2021, Newsom signed legislation expanding Medi-Cal eligibility to undocumented residents over age 50. On June 30, 2022, he signed a $307.9 billion state budget that "pledges to make all low-income adults eligible for the state's Medicaid program by 2024 regardless of their immigration status." This budget would make California the first U.S. state to guarantee healthcare to all low-income illegal immigrants, at a cost of $2.7 billion per year.

In December 2021, Newsom announced his intention to make California a "sanctuary" for abortion, which included possibly paying for procedures, travel, and lodging for out-of-state abortion seekers, if the procedure is banned in Republican-led states. In March 2022, Newsom signed a bill that would require all private health insurance plans in the state to fully cover abortion procedures, by eliminating associated co-pays and deductibles and increasing insurance premiums. In February 2023, Newsom organized the Reproductive Freedom Alliance of state governors supportive of abortion and reproductive rights.

Newsom was criticized in early 2022 for walking back from his support for universal health care and not supporting Assembly Bill 1400, which would have instituted single-payer health care in California; critics suggested that opposition from business interests, which had donated large sums to Newsom and his party, had swayed his opinion.

On July 6, 2022, Newsom signed Senate Bill 184, which established the Office of Health Care Affordability, with the stated goal to "develop data-informed policies and enforceable cost targets, with the ultimate goal of containing health care costs."

After Walgreens announced that it would refuse to carry abortion pills, Newsom tweeted, "California won't be doing business with @walgreens – or any company that cowers to the extremists and puts women's lives at risk, we're done." He also said that Walgreens was giving into "right-wing bullies" and that he would determine how California can cut ties with Walgreens.

Infrastructure and development

High-speed rail

In his February 2019 State of the State address, Newsom announced that, while work would continue on the  Central Valley segment from Bakersfield to Merced, the rest of the system would be indefinitely postponed, citing cost overruns and delays. This and other actions created tension with the State Building and Construction Trades Council of California, a labor union representing 450,000 members.

Homelessness and housing shortage 

A poll found that California voters thought the most important issue for Newsom and the state legislature to work on in 2020 was homelessness. In his first week of office, Newsom threatened to withhold state funding for infrastructure to communities that failed to take actions to alleviate California's housing shortage. In late January 2019, he announced that he would sue Huntington Beach for preventing the construction of affordable housing. A year later, the city acted to settle the lawsuit by the state. Newsom opposes NIMBY (not-in-my-back-yard) sentiment, declaring in 2022 that "NIMBYism is destroying the state". In 2021, he signed a pair of bills into law that made zoning regulations for housing less restrictive, allowing construction of duplexes and fourplexes in lots that were previously zoned exclusively for single-family homes. Newsom also signed a bill which expedites the environmental review process for new multifamily developments worth at least $15,000,000. To participate, developers must apply directly through the governor's office.

In 2022, Newsom signed 39 bills into law intended to address California's housing crisis, three of which entailed major land use reform. One bill eliminated minimum parking requirements for housing near mass transit stations throughout the state. Michael Manville, an urban planning professor at UCLA's Luskin School of Public Affairs, called it "one of the biggest land-use reforms in the country." Another bill allowed developers to build housing on some lots previously exclusively zoned for commercial use without getting local governments' permission if a certain percentage of the housing was affordable. A third bill allowed for the construction of market-rate housing on some lots previously exclusively zoned for commercial use. In a signing ceremony for the latter two bills, Newsom warned local governments, which have a history of blocking and delaying housing developments, that they would be held accountable for future housing obstructionism. Other bills Newsom signed required localities "to approve or deny various building permits within a strict timeline" and streamlined student and faculty housing projects by allowing California colleges to skip onerous review processes for new projects.

Water management

Newsom supports a series of tentative water-sharing agreements that would bring an end to the dispute between farmers, cities, fishers, and environmentalists over how much water should be left in the state's two most important rivers, the Sacramento and San Joaquin, which flow into the Delta.

Native American genocide

In a speech before representatives of Native Americans in June 2019, Newsom apologized for the genocide of Native Americans approved and abetted by the California state government upon statehood in the 19th century. By one estimate, at least 4,500 Native Californians were killed between 1849 and 1870. Newsom said, "That's what it was, a genocide. No other way to describe it. And that's the way it needs to be described in the history books."

Personal travel

Newsom's first international trip as governor was to El Salvador. With nearly 680,000 Salvadoran immigrants living in California, he said that the "state's relationship with Central America is key to California's future". He was also concerned about the tens of thousands of Salvadorans who were fleeing the smallest country in Central America for the U.S. each year. As governor of a state impacted by the debate of illegal immigration, he went to see the factors driving it firsthand, and to build business and tourism partnerships between California and Central America. He said he wanted to "ignite a more enlightened engagement and dialogue".

Personal life

Newsom was baptized and raised in his father's Catholic faith. He has described himself as an "Irish Catholic rebel...in some respects, but one that still has tremendous admiration for the Church and very strong faith". When asked about the state of the Catholic Church in 2008, he said it was in crisis. He said he stays with the Church because of his "strong connection to a greater purpose, and...higher being". Newsom identifies as a practicing Catholic, saying that he has a "strong sense of faith that is perennial, day in and day out". He is the godfather of designer and model Nats Getty.

In December 2001, Newsom married Kimberly Guilfoyle, a former San Francisco prosecutor and legal commentator for Court TV, CNN, and MSNBC. They married at Saint Ignatius Catholic Church on the campus of the University of San Francisco, where Guilfoyle had attended law school. The couple appeared in the September 2004 issue of Harper's Bazaar; the spread had them posed at the Getty Villa with the caption "the New Kennedys". They jointly filed for divorce in January 2005, citing "difficulties due to their careers on opposite coasts". Their divorce was finalized on February 28, 2006. Guilfoyle gained prominence in 2011 via a Fox News chat show. She was later named senior advisor to Republican President Donald Trump, whom Newsom has extensively criticized. Newsom later became an ordained minister with the Universal Life Church.

On January 31, 2007, Newsom's close friend, campaign manager, and former chief of staff Alex Tourk confronted Newsom after learning from his wife, Ruby Rippey-Tourk, that she and Newsom had an affair in 2005, when she was Newsom's appointments secretary. Tourk immediately resigned. Newsom admitted the affair the next day and apologized to the public, saying he was "deeply sorry" for his "personal lapse of judgment". In 2018, Rippey-Tourk said that she thought it wrong to associate Newsom's behavior with the #MeToo movement: "I was a subordinate, but I was also a free-thinking, 33-yr old adult married woman & mother.... I do want to make sure that the #metoo movement is reserved for cases and situations that deserve it."

Newsom began dating film director Jennifer Siebel in September 2006. He announced he would seek treatment for alcohol use disorder in February 2007. The couple announced their engagement in December 2007, and they were married in Stevensville, Montana, in July 2008. They have four children.

Newsom and his family moved from San Francisco to a house they bought in Kentfield in Marin County in 2012.

After his election as governor, Newsom and his family moved into the California Governor's Mansion in Downtown Sacramento and thereafter settled in Fair Oaks. In May 2019, The Sacramento Bee reported that Newsom's $3.7 million purchase of a 12,000 square foot home in Fair Oaks was the most expensive private residence sold in the Sacramento region since the year began.

In August 2021, Newsom sold a Marin County home for $5.9 million in an off-market transaction. He had originally put the property up for sale in early 2019 for $5.895 million, but removed the property from the market after a price reduction to $5.695 million.

Works
 Gavin Newsom (2013; co-authored with Lisa Dickey). Citizenville: How to Take the Town Square Digital and Reinvent Government. London: Penguin Group. . .

See also
 Electoral history of Gavin Newsom

References

Further reading
 .

External links

 Governor Gavin Newsom official government website
 Gavin Newsom for Governor campaign website
 CityMayors profile about Gavin Newsom

 
 Gavin Newsom at On the Issues

 
1967 births
20th-century American businesspeople
20th-century American politicians
21st-century American businesspeople
21st-century American male writers
21st-century American non-fiction writers
21st-century American politicians
Activists from the San Francisco Bay Area
American businesspeople in retailing
American chief executives
American drink industry businesspeople
American investors
American people of Irish descent
American people of Scottish descent
American political writers
American restaurateurs
American salespeople
American television talk show hosts
Articles containing video clips
Businesspeople from the San Francisco Bay Area
Catholics from California
Current TV people
Democratic Party governors of California
American LGBT rights activists
Lieutenant Governors of California
Living people
Mayors of San Francisco
Newsom family
People from Greenbrae, California
People from Kentfield, California
Politicians with dyslexia
Russian Hill, San Francisco
Santa Clara Broncos baseball players
Television personalities from San Francisco
Writers from San Francisco
Redwood High School (Larkspur, California) alumni